Thegidi is a 2014 Indian Tamil-language neo-noir mystery thriller film directed by P. Ramesh and produced by C. V. Kumar under his banner Thirukumaran Entertainment. The film features Ashok Selvan and Janani in the leading roles, while Nivas Prasanna composes the film's music. The film released on 28 February 2014, and opened to generally positive reviews from critics. This film was remade in Malayalam as Chanakya Thanthram in 2018.

Plot
Vetri (Ashok Selvan) studies a criminology course and possesses great observation skills, and this makes his professor, Govardhan (Rajan Iyer) to insist him taking up a detective job. Vetri gets a job in a private detective agency and leaves to Chennai to meet Govardhan and receive his blessings. He joins the detective agency and his bosses are Sadagoppan (Pradeep Nair) and Sailesh (Jayakumar). Vetri stays with his close friend Nambi (Kaali Venkat).

Vetri is given a task of collecting information about three people by following them secretly. He does his job with great passion and loves it to the maximum. Meanwhile, he meets Madhusree (Janani) and develops an attraction towards her immediately. Vetri gets all the information about the three people assigned to him and submits the reports to his bosses.

Vetri's next assignment is to gather information about Madhu. Vetri is excited on this and starts following her. Despite a rule that detectives are not allowed to get in touch with the people they follow, Vetri is tempted to get introduced to Madhu. Vetri introduces himself as a job seeker to Madhu and they become good friends. Slowly, love blossoms between the two.

Suddenly, one of the people, whom Vetri has gathered some information, is killed mysteriously. Vetri meets his bosses and request the client details of those who requested to follow him, but they convince him giving some reasons. Similarly, another person is also killed. Now, Vetri's doubts increase seeing the sequence of murders. Vetri calls up the third person he has followed before and wants to meet him. But the third person is also killed, while he is on the way to meet Vetri.

Vetri worries fearing Madhu's death as she was his last assignment and decides to protect her. The police while investigating, finds out that Vetri was the last person who called the third person before his death and arrived for an investigation. Madhu gets shocked on knowing that Vetri is a detective and thinks that he pretended as loving her to get some info.
 
Vetri meets Police Inspector Raghuram (Jayaprakash) and informs all the happenings. Raghuram and Vetri try to visit the detective agency, but are surprised to see that there is no such agency existing in the address. No one knows about the whereabouts of the detective agency and its founders.

Vetri starts thinking of any clue and remembers his bosses kept frequently mentioning a name. He finds out that it is a hotel located in the outskirts of Chennai with clues in a car and finds out a courier. Vetri notes down the address mentioned in the courier and runs away before Sailesh comes back.

Meanwhile, Sailesh understands that Vetri has searched his car and he rushes to his home to destroy all the evidences. Sailesh shreds many papers in his home. Vetri arrives to the place and fights with Sailesh. When Sailesh is about to kill Vetri, Raghuram comes to the spot and shoots Sailesh. Raghuram and Vetri conduct a search in Sailesh's home and found a number. They believe it to be an insurance policy and begin an investigation. Raghuram tracks down the insurance company that has issued the policy and they visit the company with the hope of finding some truth.

On inquiring with the clerk (Kavithalaya Krishnan), they find that the number is a life insurance policy taken by one of the people, who got killed and the sum insured is Rs.1 Crore. They are shocked to know that the insurance money was collected by the person's father as all the three people who got killed had no parents or relatives.

Suddenly, Vetri sees that the insurance company branch manager is none other than Sadagopan. Vetri and Raghuram traps Sadagopan and understands the truth. Sadagopan's real name is Poornachandran and is the manager of the insurance company. He goes through the details of all the policy holders, that are insured by the employers and targets people who have no parents or relatives.

Poornachandran uses his power to forge a policy taken in favor of those people. Sailesh, his friend, kills the insured person and they collect the money from the insurance agency. To Vetri's shock, Govardhan is also a part of the crime and he goes to collect the money as the insured person's father. Above all, it was Govardhan, who has informed about Vetri's observation skills to Poornachandran and asking him to recruit him as a detective, so that he could be a use for their needs.

Vetri feels bad thinking about Govardhan as he had respected him a lot before. But, Govardhan revealed that he and his ailing mother have suffered a lot and the society didn't help them which made him to choose this path. Govardhan apologizes to Vetri and commits suicide. Vetri and Raghuram believe that the professor's actual name in Vallabha, as Poornachandran and Sailesh keep referring to this name often.

Life is smooth for Vetri as he has been reunited with Madhu and lives with his family. But, one day, he receives a phone call from Vallabha suddenly and Vetri gets shocked knowing that there is someone above Govardhan, who is behind all the crimes. The film ends here setting a path for a sequel.

Cast

 Ashok Selvan as Vetri
 Janani as Madhusree
 Jayaprakash as Inspector Raghuram
 Kaali Venkat as Nambi
 Jayakumar as Sailesh
 Pradeep K Vijayan as Poornachandran (Sadagoppan)
 Rajan Iyer as Govardhan
 Shalu Shamu as Aparna
 Ashritha Sreedas as Vidhya
 Sai Prashanth as Kamalakannan
 Rekha Suresh as Rukkumani, Aparna's mother
 "Soodhu Kavvum" Sivakumar as Madhavan
 Kavithalaya Krishnan as Ranganathan
 Soundar Rajan as Head Constable Chakkarapanni
 Winner Ramachandran as S.I. Sukumar
 Puli Paandi as Dileepan
 Pattu Maami as Govardhan's mother

Production
The film was announced in June 2013 as a joint venture between Thirukumaran Entertainment and Vel Media. Along with C. V. Kumar, the film reunited several of the crew from Soodhu Kavvum (2013) with cinematographer Dinesh, editor Leo John Paul and actor Ashok Selvan all from that unit. The film's director was revealed to be P. Ramesh and Nivas K. Prasanna would compose music. Janani Iyer, seen before in Avan Ivan (2011) and Paagan (2012), was signed on to depict the role of a college girl.

The film, described as a "murder mystery", was wrapped up within 45 days and in November 2013, post-production works were ongoing. It was reported that all the songs were set to be montages and further filming was not required, even though the songs were incomplete during production.

Soundtrack

The film's soundtrack and score were composed by newcomer Nivas K. Prasanna.

Prasanna received praise for both the songs and the score. IANS wrote, "If Thegidi turns out to be a hit, debutant music composer Nivas Prasanna deserves huge credit for the success. He carries the tension of the film right till the end with his background score and songs that are placed in the narrative at right junctures". Sify wrote, "[a] highlight of the film is Nivas Prasanna’s music and extraordinary BGM. The romantic melody Yaar Ezhuthiatho... is very soothing and BGM goes with the narration". Rediff wrote, "The music by Nivas is an absolute joy. All the songs, as well as the background score are perfect".

Release
The satellite rights of the film were sold to STAR Vijay. After the censor process, the team announced the release date as 28 February.

Critical reception
Baradwaj Rangan of The Hindu wrote "there are plenty of tense moments, thanks to the deliberate pacing (that steers clear of cheap, amped-up thrills) and the fact that the film keeps zooming in on a small cast of characters. Thegidi is proof that if the small things are worked out well, the bigger ones will take care of themselves". Sify called the film "a well-made, edge-of- the-seat thriller with enough twists and turns. It keeps the deception game going till the last scene, with a taut script and outstanding BGM by Nivas Prasanna". Indiaglitz gave it a 3.5/5 rating and stated, "Thegidi is one such brilliant movie flaunted by beaming background score grips your adrenaline rush through the movie". Rediff gave it a 2.5 star rating and called it "a great effort by debutant director P Ramesh, who seems to have extracted the best from his team, be it the actors or the technicians".

The Times of India gave the film 3 stars out of 5 and said "What's refreshing about Thegidi is how director Ramesh manages to keep things understated even when the situations seem to turn overwhelming. Barring a couple of scenes, there is a matter-of-factness in the approach that keeps the movie from turning into a bombastic thriller in which everything is at stake. This is the film's plus and also its weakness". Oneindia in its review said "The film leaves an impact from the word go, the film attracts you. The first fifteen minutes should not be missed by audience and the opening credits is impressive". IANS gave it 3.5 stars and wrote, "With its share of ups and downs, Thegidi is a taut film executed in style.

Box office
The film had a slow start at the box office, but improved later due to positive reviews from critics and word of mouth. According to Behindwoods.com, the film's shows increased in its 4th week. At the Chennai box office, the film had collected 96,62,193 after 8 weeks. In March 2014, Producers Council's President Keyaar said that Thegidi was one of the two Tamil films that turned out to be profitable ventures for all sections in 2014 till then. Sify later reported that the film was profitable if the collections from the theatrical run and the dubbing and satellite rights were added together. Producer C. V. Kumar in late March informed that the rights for music and overseas were sold for 7 lacs and 24 lacs respectively and that the film had collected a theatrical share of 2.2 crores till then.

Sequel
In April 2014, director Ramesh stated that he would make a sequel to Thegidi in future. He said, "Thegidi 2 is definitely on the cards, but it won't happen immediately. I have started working on a new project which I intend to work on before the sequel". He had planned a sequel even before the release of Thegidi. "I didn't have a bound script ready for the sequel, but I had decided to continue the sequel with Vallabha's character that you see in Thegidi. I decided this while working on the [first film]".

See also 
 List of films featuring surveillance

References

External links
 

2010s romantic thriller films
2014 films
Indian detective films
2010s Tamil-language films
Indian romantic thriller films
Films scored by Nivas K. Prasanna
Tamil films remade in other languages
2014 directorial debut films